Spirit of the Nation is the tenth album by Irish folk and rebel band The Wolfe Tones. It became the band's best-selling album.

The final track, "Streets of New York" reached the top of the IRMA charts. It was written by Liam Reilly of Bagatelle and discusses Irish emigration to New York.

Track list 
 Dingle Bay
 No Irish Need Apply
 Down by the Glenside
 Bold Fenian Men
 Paddle Your Own Canoe
 Padraic Pearse
 The Lough Sheelin Eviction
 Song of the Celts
 Butterfly
 Protestant Men
 Only Our Rivers Run Free
 St. Patrick was a Gentleman
 Ireland Unfree
 Carolan's Concerto
 Streets of New York

References

The Wolfe Tones albums
1981 albums